Parapedobacter composti is a Gram-negative and non-spore-forming bacterium from the genus of Parapedobacter which has been isolated from cotton waste compost in Suwon in Korea.

References

External links
Type strain of Parapedobacter composti at BacDive -  the Bacterial Diversity Metadatabase	

Sphingobacteriia
Bacteria described in 2010